Skalisty Golets is the highest peak in the Stanovoy Range, Russia.

The Skalisty Golets is a ‘’golets’’-type of mountain with a bald peak. Administratively it is located in the Sakha Republic (Yakutia) of the Russian Far East.

See also
List of mountains and hills of Russia

References

Mountains of the Sakha Republic
South Siberian Mountains